Noah Global Honored Crown 2022 was a professional wrestling event promoted by CyberFight's sub-brand Pro Wrestling Noah. It took place on November 10, 2022, in Tokyo, Japan, at the Korakuen Hall. The event aired on CyberAgent's AbemaTV online linear television service and CyberFight's streaming service Wrestle Universe.

Background

Storylines
The event featured six professional wrestling matches that resulted from scripted storylines, where wrestlers portrayed villains, heroes, or less distinguishable characters in the scripted events that built tension and culminated in a wrestling match or series of matches.

Event
The event has been opened by the confrontation between the rookie teams of Daishi Ozawa and Yasutaka Yano, and Kai Fujimura and Yoshiki Inamura, bout solded with the victory of the latter team. In the second match,  Kongo (Hajime Ohara and Shuji Kondo) defeated Stinger (Atsushi Kotoge and Seiki Yoshioka) to win the GHC Junior Heavyweight Tag Team Championship. The next bout saw Dante Leon defeating Ninja Mack to win the GHC Junior Heavyweight Championship for the first time in his career. Next, Satoshi Kojima and Takashi Sugiura successfully defended the GHC Tag Team Championship for the second time in a row against Akitoshi Saito and Mohammed Yone. The semi main event saw El Hijo del Dr. Wagner Jr. taking the GHC National Championship from Masakatsu Funaki, ending the latter's reign at 292 days which was the longest till it's date.

In the main event, Timothy Thatcher clashed with Kaito Kiyomiya in a bout for the GHC Heavyweight Championship which concluded with Kiyomiya securing his second defense over the title.

Results

References

External links
Pro Wrestling Noah official website

Pro Wrestling Noah
CyberAgent
2022 in professional wrestling
December 2022 events in Japan
Professional wrestling in Tokyo
Pro Wrestling Noah shows